Sadine Correia Mascarenhas (born 9 June 1992), known as Sadine Correia, is a Luxembourger footballer who plays as a defender for Bettembourg and the Luxembourg women's national team.

References

1992 births
Living people
Luxembourgian women's footballers
Women's association football defenders
1. FC Saarbrücken (women) players
2. Frauen-Bundesliga players
Luxembourg women's international footballers
Luxembourgian people of Cape Verdean descent
Luxembourgian expatriate footballers
Luxembourgian expatriate sportspeople in Germany
Expatriate women's footballers in Germany